George Safford Parker (November 1, 1863 – July 19, 1937) was an American inventor and industrialist.

Biography

Early life
Parker was born in Chicago, Illinois in November 1863, and graduated from Upper Iowa University in Fayette, Iowa. 

He worked as a telegraphy instructor in Janesville, Wisconsin, and had a sideline repairing and selling fountain pens. Dismayed by the unreliability of the pens, he experimented with ways to prevent ink leaks.

Career as Inventor and Industrialist
In 1888 he founded the Parker Pen Company and the next year he received his first fountain pen patent. By 1908, his factory on Main Street in Janesville was reportedly the largest pen manufacturing facility in the world. Parker eventually became one of the world's premier pen brands, and one of the first brands with a global presence.

Legacy
George S. Parker High School in Janesville is his namesake.

Notes

1863 births
1937 deaths
American manufacturing businesspeople
19th-century American inventors
20th-century American inventors
People from Janesville, Wisconsin
People from Shullsburg, Wisconsin
Upper Iowa University alumni